The Einödsberg is a 1589 m high mountain in the Allgäu Alps near Oberstdorf.

References

Mountains of the Alps
Allgäu Alps
Mountains of Bavaria
One-thousanders of Germany
Oberallgäu